Yohann Taberlet (born 29 March 1981) is a French skier.  He has a disability and uses a wheelchair.  He skied at the 2011 IPC Alpine Skiing World Championships. He was the second skier to finish in the men's sitting slalom race and was the third skier to finish in the sitting men's Super Combined race.

References

External links 
 
 

1981 births
Living people
French male alpine skiers
Alpine skiers at the 2014 Winter Paralympics
Université Savoie-Mont Blanc alumni
21st-century French people